Jane E. Powdrell-Culbert (born April 30, 1949, in Albuquerque, New Mexico) is an American politician who served as a Republican member of the New Mexico House of Representatives for the 44th district from 2003 to 2023.

Elections
 2002: When the District 44 incumbent Republican Representative Judy Vanderstar Russell ran for Lieutenant Governor of New Mexico, Powdrell-Culbert ran in the 2002 Republican primary, winning with 892 votes (51.3%) and won the November 5, 2002, general election with 5,080 votes (64.3%) against the Democratic nominee Mara Minwegen.
 2004: Powdrell-Culbert was unopposed for both the June 1, 2004, Republican primary, winning with 618 votes and the November 2, 2004, general election, winning with 12,018 votes.
 2006: Powdrell-Culbert was unopposed for the June 6, 2006, Republican primary, winning with 817 votes and won the November 7, 2006, general election with 7,516 votes (59.1%) against the Democratic nominee Eliot Gould.
 2008: Powdrell-Culbert was unopposed for the June 8, 2008, Republican primary, winning with 2,527 votes and won the November 4, 2008, general election with 11,581 votes (54.1%) against Lisa Cour.
 2010: Powdrell-Culbert was unopposed for the June 1, 2010, Republican primary, winning with 2,840 votes and won the November 2, 2010, general election with 9,960 votes (62.8%) against the Democratic nominee Joel Davis.
 2012: Powdrell-Culbert was unopposed for both the June 5, 2012, Republican primary, winning with 1,486 votes and the November 6, 2012, general election, winning with 10,136 votes.

References

External links
 Official web page at the New Mexico Legislature
 
 Jane Powdrell-Culbert at Ballotpedia
 Jane E. Powdrell-Culbert at the National Institute on Money in State Politics

Politicians from Albuquerque, New Mexico
1949 births
Living people
African-American state legislators in New Mexico
African-American women in politics
Republican Party members of the New Mexico House of Representatives
Women state legislators in New Mexico
21st-century American politicians
21st-century American women politicians
People from Corrales, New Mexico
21st-century African-American women
21st-century African-American politicians
20th-century African-American people
20th-century African-American women